Album Raises New and Troubling Questions is a 2011 compilation album by the American alternative rock group They Might Be Giants. It is the second compilation released by the band through their own Idlewild Recordings. It includes several songs originally written for Join Us as well as other rarities. It was released online via iTunes and Amazon and limited run of CDs from the band's website.

The cover of "Tubthumping" by Chumbawamba was recorded for The A.V. Club'''s Undercover series of videos. The song features Nathan Rabin and other AV Club writers on backing vocals.

The song "200 SBemails" was originally featured on the web series Homestar Runner.

In 2012, the album was included in the Humble Music Bundle.

Track listing
 "O We" – 0:48
 "Authenticity Trip" – 2:22
 "You Probably Get That A Lot" (Elegant Too Remix) – 3:03
 "Marty Beller Mask" – 2:00
 "Now I Know" – 1:35
 "How Now Dark Cloud" – 2:07
 "The Fellowship of Hell" – 2:10
 "Mountain Flowers" – 1:11
 "Doom Doom" – 1:12
 "Money for Dope" – 2:39
 "Read a Book" – 1:04
 "Havalina" – 2:37
 "Tubthumping" (feat. The Onion AV Club Choir) – 3:22
 "Electronic Istanbul (Not Constantinople)" – 2:49
 "Cloisonné" (Live) – 2:47
 "200 SBemails" – 0:42
 "Boat of Car" (feat. The Other Thing Brass Band) – 1:14
 "Mr. Me" (feat. The Other Thing Brass Band) – 2:00
 "Dirt Bike" (feat. The Other Thing Brass Band) – 3:07
 "Particle Man" (feat. The Other Thing Brass Band) – 2:07

References

External linksAlbum Raises New and Troubling Questions'' at This Might Be A Wiki

2011 compilation albums
They Might Be Giants compilation albums
Printworthy redirects
Idlewild Recordings compilation albums